The Google People Cards is a knowledge base used by Google and its services to enhance its search engine's results with information gathered from people in India,. After launching in India, Google has now launched this service in African countries, such as Kenya, Nigeria and South Africa This service allows individuals to create their profile on Google's search engine.

References 

Google